The following is a list of coaches who have been the official coach of the Melbourne Football Club, an Australian rules football club which plays in the Australian Football League (AFL), formerly the Victorian Football League (VFL).

 Statistics are correct to round 23, 2021.

References
http://afl.allthestats.com

Lists of Australian Football League coaches by club

Melbourne sport-related lists